Zhanna Yevhenivna Lozumyrska (born 25 January 1981) is a Ukrainian former swimmer, who specialized in middle-distance freestyle and butterfly events. Lozumyrska competed for Ukraine in two swimming events at the 2000 Summer Olympics in Sydney. She achieved a FINA B-cut of 2:14.14 (200 m butterfly) from the European Championships in Helsinki, Finland. On the fourth day of the Games, Lozumyrska placed twenty-fourth in the 200 m butterfly. Swimming in heat two, she faded down the stretch from third at the halfway turn to pick up a fourth seed in 2:14.47, about a third of a second (0.33) outside her entry standard. The following day, in the 4×200 m freestyle relay, Lozumyrska and her teammates Olena Lapunova, Nadiya Beshevli, and Albina Bordunova were disqualified from heat one in the prelims for an early launch on the lead-off leg.

References

1981 births
Living people
Ukrainian female swimmers
Olympic swimmers of Ukraine
Swimmers at the 2000 Summer Olympics
Ukrainian female freestyle swimmers
Female butterfly swimmers
Sportspeople from Kyiv
20th-century Ukrainian women
21st-century Ukrainian women